Anderson House may refer to:

Canada
 Anderson House (St. John's), in Newfoundland

United States

Alaska
Oscar Anderson House Museum, Anchorage, AK, listed on the National Register of Historic Places (NRHP) in Alaska

Arizona
Max J. Anderson House, Kingman, Arizona, listed on the NRHP in Mohave County
R. L. Anderson House, Kingman, Arizona, listed on the NRHP in Mohave County
Anderson-Johannes House, Phoenix, Arizona, listed on the NRHP in Maricopa County
Helen Anderson House, Phoenix, Arizona, listed on the NRHP in Maricopa County

Arkansas
George Anderson House, Big Springs, Arkansas, listed on the NRHP in Stone County
Anderson-Hobson Mercantile Store, Foreman, Arkansas, listed on the NRHP in Little River County
H.M. Anderson House, Little Rock, Arkansas, listed on the NRHP in Pulaski County
Dr. A. G. Anderson House, Eudora, Arkansas, listed on the NRHP in Chicot County

Colorado
Peter Anderson House, Fort Collins, Colorado, listed on the NRHP in Larimer County

Connecticut
Leroy Anderson House, Woodbury, Connecticut, listed on the NRHP in Litchfield County

Delaware
Anderson House (Newark, Delaware)

Florida
Charles B. Anderson House, Elfers or Holiday, Florida, listed on the NRHP in Pasco County
Anderson-Frank House, Tampa, Florida, listed on the NRHP in Hillsborough County

Georgia
Anderson House (Danburg, Georgia)
Capt. R. J. Anderson House, Macon, Georgia, listed on the NRHP in Bibb County
Judge Clifford Anderson House, Macon, Georgia, listed on the NRHP in Bibb County
Whitman-Anderson House, Ringgold, Georgia, listed on the NRHP in Catoosa County

Idaho
Anderson-Elwell House, Weiser, Idaho, listed on the NRHP in Washington County

Illinois
John C. Anderson House, Carlinville, Illinois, listed on the NRHP in Macoupin County
Tiger-Anderson House, Springfield, Illinois, listed on the NRHP in Sangamon County

Indiana
Anderson-Thompson House, Indianapolis, Indiana, listed on the NRHP in Marion County

Iowa
D.H. Anderson House, Maquoketa, Iowa, listed on the NRHP in Jackson County

Kentucky
Anderson House (Haskingsville, Kentucky)
Anderson-Smith House, Paducah, Kentucky, listed on the NRHP in McCracken County
Bourne-Anderson House, Taylorsville, Kentucky, listed on the NRHP in Spencer County

Massachusetts
Ludwig Anderson Three-Decker, Worcester, Massachusetts, listed on the NRHP in Worcester County

Michigan
William Anderson House, Ann Arbor, Michigan, listed on the NRHP in Washtenaw County

Minnesota
Andrew G. Anderson House, Hibbing, Minnesota, listed on the NRHP in St. Louis County
Gustaf Anderson House, Lindstrom, Minnesota, listed on the NRHP in Chisago County
J.A. Anderson House, Lamberton, Minnesota, listed on the NRHP in Redwood County
J. S. Anderson House, Minneota, Minnesota, listed on the NRHP in Lyon County
Alexander P. Anderson Estate-Tower View, Red Wing, Minnesota, listed on the NRHP in Goodhue County

Missouri
Charles Isaac and Lizzie Hunter Moore Anderson House, Commerce, Missouri, listed on the NRHP in Scott County
Battle of Lexington State Historic Site, Lexington, Missouri, listed on the NRHP in Lafayette County
Elijah Teague Anderson House, Republic, Missouri, listed on the NRHP in Greene County

Mississippi
Stewart-Anderson House, Tupelo, Mississippi, listed on the NRHP in Lee County
Col. Chap Anderson House, Kosciusko, Mississippi, listed on the NRHP in Attala County
Dewitt Anderson House, West Point, Mississippi, listed on the NRHP in Clay County

Montana
Herman and Hannah Anderson House, Forsyth, Montana, listed on the NRHP in Rosebud County
Anderson House (Lewistown, Montana)

New Jersey
Anderson-Capner House, Lawrence, New Jersey, listed on the NRHP in Mercer County

Ohio
Judge William Shaw Anderson House, Austintown, Ohio, listed on the NRHP in Mahoning County
William Marshall Anderson House, Circleville, Ohio, listed on the NRHP in Pickaway County
Anderson-Shaffer House, Hamilton, Ohio, listed on the NRHP in Butler County
Felkner-Anderson House, Ostrander, Ohio, listed on the NRHP in Delaware County
Levi Anderson House, Chillicothe, Ohio, listed on the NRHP in Ross County

Oregon
Emanuel and Christina Anderson House, Gresham, Oregon, listed on the NRHP in Multnomah County
James Mechlin Anderson House, Jefferson, Oregon, listed on the NRHP in Marion County
Lewis Anderson House, Barn and Granary, The Dalles, Oregon, listed on the NRHP in Wasco County
Thomas N. Anderson House, Gold Hill, Oregon, listed on the NRHP in Jackson County

Pennsylvania
Marian Anderson House, Philadelphia, Pennsylvania, listed on the NRHP in Philadelphia County

South Carolina
Kincaid-Anderson House, Jenkinsville, South Carolina, listed on the NRHP in Fairfield County
Anderson House (Rock Hill, South Carolina)

South Dakota
Dr. Andrew Anderson House, Canton, South Dakota, listed on the NRHP in Lincoln County
Anderson Homestead, Hub City, South Dakota, listed on the NRHP in Clay County
John F. Anderson House, Mitchell, South Dakota, listed on the NRHP in Davison County

Tennessee
James E. Collins House, Franklin, Tennessee, also known as Anderson House, formerly NRHP-listed
Anderson-Coward House, Memphis, Tennessee, listed on the NRHP in Shelby County

Texas
Anderson House and Store, Salado, Texas, listed on the NRHP in Bell County
Williams-Anderson House, Tyler, Texas, listed on the NRHP in Smith County
John W. Anderson House, Houston, Texas, listed on the NRHP in Harris County

Utah
Martin Anderson House, Brigham City, Utah, listed on the NRHP in Box Elder County
Niels Ole Anderson House, Ephraim, Utah, listed on the NRHP in Sanpete County
James Anderson House (Fairview, Utah), Fairview, Utah, listed on the NRHP in Sanpete County
Anderson-Clark Farmstead, Grantsville, Utah, listed on the NRHP in Tooele County
Lewis and Clara Anderson House, Manti, Utah, listed on the NRHP in Sanpete County
Alfred C. and Annie L. Olsen Anderson House, Sandy, Utah, listed on the NRHP in Salt Lake County
Charles M. and Fannie M. Allsop Anderson House, Sandy, Utah, listed on the NRHP in Salt Lake County
Frederick C. and Anna Anderson House, Sandy, Utah, listed on the NRHP in Salt Lake County
John A. Anderson House, Sandy, Utah, listed on the NRHP in Salt Lake County
Y. Martin and Hannah Nelson Anderson House, Sandy, Utah, listed on the NRHP in Salt Lake County

Virginia
Anderson House (Haymakertown, Virginia)
Anderson-Foster House, Holly Grove, Virginia, listed on the NRHP in Louisa County

Washington D.C.
Larz Anderson House, Washington DC, American headquarters of the Society of the Cincinnati and listed on the NRHP

Wisconsin
Brady Anderson and Waldemar Ager House, Eau Claire, Wisconsin, listed on the NRHP in Eau Claire County
Mons Anderson House, La Crosse, Wisconsin, listed on the NRHP in La Crosse County

See also
Anderson Manor (disambiguation)
Anderson Barn (disambiguation)
Anderson Farm (disambiguation)
Anderson Hall (disambiguation)
Anderson Historic District (disambiguation)